Elliott Richardson (born October 26, 1985 in Toronto, Ontario) is a professional Canadian football defensive back who is currently a free agent. He previously played for the Edmonton Eskimos and Saskatchewan Roughriders. Elliott attended Richview Collegiate Institute, in Etobicoke. He played CIS football for the Acadia Axemen.

Richardson was signed by the Eskimos as an undrafted free agent in 2009 and played for them for two seasons.  He moved to the Saskatchewan Roughriders prior to the 2011 season and was released by the team on September 7, 2011.

References

1985 births
Living people
Acadia Axemen football players
Canadian football defensive backs
Edmonton Elks players
Players of Canadian football from Ontario
Saskatchewan Roughriders players
Canadian football people from Toronto